The FEL lamp (less accurately called a light bulb) is an ANSI standard 1000 watt quartz halogen lamp with a G9.5 medium 2-pin base used in many stage and studio lights that costs around $12 and is available from a number of manufacturers including GE, Osram, Ushio, Eiko, and Philips. Note that the term FEL is an ANSI designation (not an acronym).

What sets this apart from other lamps used for similar purposes is that it almost literally sets the standard (more precisely, it is the means by which the standard is transmitted from one location to another).  Specially seasoned and calibrated FEL lamps are used in laboratories as radiance and irradiance standards (related to luminance and illuminance) used to calibrate photometers, light meters, spectrophotometers and other laboratory instruments.  An FEL lamp purchased from NIST that has been calibrated for light output, color temperature, and spectral energy distribution is over ten thousand dollars.   NIST Traceable FEL lamps are available from commercial suppliers.

Matching sockets for the G9.5 base include Sylvania TP22, TP220, Buhl Electric QEW-2, QEW-21, QEW-22, Bender + Wirth 968, Ushio: C-3, C-3(A).    The calibration lamps are generally modified to use a larger bi-post base that fits into special kinematic mount sockets for precise optical alignment.  Although the socket for calibration lamps is not polarized, polarity must be observed because the calibration lamps are normally run on DC and the lamp filament will recrystallize according to the applied DC polarity.

References

External links
NIST Calibration Services: Spectroradiometric Source Measurements
Characterization of Modified FEL Quartz-Halogen Lamps for Photometric Standards.
Photometric data for stage lighting fixtures lists 125 popular stage lighting instruments, including lamp used.
NIST Total Spectral Radiant Flux shows the light output and color temperature vs. viewing angle
Breman Verlichting - Webshop Lampen 
OSA Handbook of Applied Photometry
Hi-Tech Lamps - Halogen Sockets

Types of lamp